Quedex is a game released for the Commodore 64 in 1987 by Thalamus. It is the third game developed by Finnish game programmer Stavros Fasoulas. The game consists of ten planes where the player steers a silvery ball and must find an exit square in order to leave the maze-like play-area. The name Quedex derives from the subtitle "The Quest for Ultimate Dexterity". In 1988, Epyx released ports of Quedex for the Amiga and MS-DOS under the name Mindroll.

Gameplay
The ten levels can be played in any order the player chooses. The game contains features and challenges such as jumping, going through teleports and finding keys that open gates. Only Planes 4 and 8 feature music, due to their more frenetic nature.

Completing a plane took you to a brief bonus plane, in which a set sequence of directions had to be repeated.

Ports
Quedex was released in America by Epyx under the name Mindroll on the Amiga and MS-DOS in 1988, and on the TRS-80 Color Computer in 1989. Silent Software was behind the conversion. The game also bore Thalamus copyrights. The look and feel of Mindroll was more bizarre and arcane in nature, with the sphere becoming an eyeball or 8-ball and the plane walls being ornately decorated. However, while the graphics were more colourful, the frame rate dropped greatly on both formats.

Reception
The game was positively reviewed by Zzap!64 who described it as "an original, beautifully designed and superbly implemented puzzle package". It was given an overall score of 92%, earning the magazine's Sizzler accolade.  Commodore User were also impressed by the game, praising the "superb" graphics and sound and stating that it was "a strange game but a great game". It was awarded a 9/10 overall rating.

References

External links
Dome.fi - Early years of Finnish games (in Finnish)

1987 video games
Amiga games
Commodore 64 games
Epyx games
Puzzle video games
Silent Software games
Single-player video games
Thalamus Ltd games
TRS-80_Color_Computer_games
Video games developed in Finland